Joint Regional Correctional Facility (JRCF) can refer to:
Northwest Joint Regional Correctional Facility
Midwest Joint Regional Correctional Facility